Don Schroeder (born March 20, 1951) is an American politician who served as a member of the Kansas House of Representatives for the 74th district from 2007 to 2019.

Education 
Schroeder earned Bachelor of Business Administration from Tabor College and a Master of Public Administration from Wichita State University.

Career 
Schroeder operated a Production Agriculture Operation for 30 years and also served as a member of the McPherson County Board of Commissioners. He also served on the Inman USD 448 School Board for five years.

Schroeder opposes same-sex marriage and abortion because he believes they are "morally lacking."

References

External links
 Official website
 Kansas Legislature - Don Schroeder
 Project Vote Smart profile
 Kansas Votes profile

County commissioners in Kansas
Republican Party members of the Kansas House of Representatives
Living people
1951 births
21st-century American politicians
Tabor College (Kansas) alumni
Wichita State University alumni